Canifa is a genus of false flower beetles in the family Scraptiidae. There are at least four described species in Canifa.

Species
These four species belong to the genus Canifa:
 Canifa pallipennis LeConte, 1878
 Canifa pallipes (Melsheimer, 1846)
 Canifa plagiata (Melsheimer, 1846)
 Canifa pusilla (Haldeman, 1848)

References

Further reading

External links

 

Scraptiidae
Articles created by Qbugbot